Caecilia volcani is a species of caecilian in the family Caeciliidae. It is endemic to Panama. Its natural habitats are subtropical or tropical moist lowland forests, subtropical or tropical moist montane forests, plantations, rural gardens, and heavily degraded former forest.

References

volcani
Amphibians described in 1969
Taxonomy articles created by Polbot